Axel Camillo Eitzen (27 July 1883 – 1 November 1968) was a Norwegian ship-owner.

He was born in Tønsberg as a son of ship-owner Axel Camillo Eitzen and Caroline Johanne Hansen (1857–1911). In 1911 he married Frida Falch, a daughter of a pharmacist in Larvik.

He finished secondary education in 1901, and then embarked on lengthy commercial studies in England, Germany, France and Belgium. In 1914 he became a co-owner in the family company Camillo Eitzen & Co., founded in 1883 and since growing to a major corporation. It was renamed to Tschudi & Eitzen in 1936.

His brother Johan emigrated to Uruguay to pursue enterprises there. Axel Camillo Eitzen died in 1968 and was buried at Ris.

References

1883 births
1968 deaths
People from Tønsberg
Norwegian businesspeople in shipping